"Help Us—Save Us—Take Us Away" is a song by industrial rock group KMFDM from their 1992 album Money. The "Schnitzel Mix" on the single is identical to the album version.

Reception
The Trouser Press Guide to '90s Rock described the singing of Dorona Alberti on the song as "Nietsche-goes-disco chant[ing]" and the song's steel guitar as "lonesome".  Jeff Bagato of Option magazine called the song "a fascinating and oddly beautiful concoction".

Track listing

1992 release

2008 7" reissue

References

1992 singles
KMFDM songs
1992 songs
Wax Trax! Records singles
Songs written by Sascha Konietzko
Songs written by Günter Schulz